St Mary's School was a private Roman Catholic day and boarding school for girls, founded in 1945 in a rural setting near Shaftesbury, England. The school had a sixth form and was a member of the Girls' Schools Association. After operating at a loss for some time, the school closed in July 2020.

Although the school's postal address was in Dorset, its site lay just over the county border in Wiltshire, within the parish of Donhead St Mary.

History

St Mary's was founded in 1945 by the nuns of the Institute of the Blessed Virgin Mary (also known as the Sisters of Loreto) whose principles are based on the life and works of Mary Ward. Hence it had the same motto as its sister schools in Ascot and Cambridge.

The school became a registered charity in 1995. It was managed by a board of governors, but retained its strong Catholic ethos.

In 2018, the charity had income of £4.7 million. This was £866,000 less than its expenses, which included £943,000 in bursaries and scholarships that were granted to 96 pupils.

Pastoral care
As a Catholic school, pupils attended mass and worship services on a regular basis, and spirituality was considered an important part of school life. The houses took turns to lead services, giving pupils a chance to participate in the service themselves. Spiritual retreats were held by year groups throughout the year.

There were three main houses which were named after places where Mary Ward had lived: Newby, Harewell and York.

The school's pastoral care was commended in the 2007 ISI inspection.

Boarding
Over half of the school's pupils were boarders, all of them full-time and organised by year groups into five boarding houses.

 St Jude: Years 5 to 8
 St Edith: Years 9 and 10
 St Thomas More: Years 11 and 12
 Mary Ward: Year 13

Academic achievement
St Mary's was one of the top performing independent schools in the county. It was one of the few schools in the county which did not suffer from the new GCSE grading system using the English Baccalaureate introduced in 2010, as candidates achieved a 100% pass rate.

Closure 
After operating at a loss for some years, the school entered administration in mid-July 2020 and was immediately closed. The school's governors wrote that the effects of the COVID-19 pandemic had "wiped away" recent financial progress.

Despite lying in Wiltshire, the site was purchased for £10.05 million in January 2021 by Dorset Council, which described it as "suitable for a broad range of services and community uses, which could include provision for Dorset children, supported living for our Dorset care leavers, provision for adults with disabilities, as well as a possible site for businesses to boost our local economy and more besides".

Notable former pupils

Laura Lopes
Lady Flora McDonnell
Clare Smales
Anna Chancellor
Martha Fiennes
Sophie Kinsella
Sarah Bradford

References

External links
 
 Profile on MyDaughter
 Profile on the ISC website
ISI Inspection Reports

Defunct schools in Wiltshire
Girls' schools in Wiltshire
Educational institutions established in 1946
1946 establishments in England
Defunct Catholic schools in the Diocese of Plymouth
Catholic boarding schools in England
Boarding schools in Wiltshire
Member schools of the Girls' Schools Association
Sisters of Loreto schools
Shaftesbury